Valmir Ribeiro Siqueira or simply Valmir  (born October 11, 1986 in Cataguases), is a Brazilian left back. He currently plays for Clube Atlético Penapolense.

Career
Revealed in the youth of the CRB had tickets for the cruise and unsuccessfully by Denizlispor, Turkey, to reach the Palmeiras in 2007, and stand out in the state title in 2008.

That same year, he moved to Vasco da Gama, where he campaigned as the Rio club demoted to Serie B in the Brazilian Championship.

After defending the Ituano in 2009, was hired by Vitória for the 2010 season.

Honours
São Paulo State Championship: 2008

External links
 sambafoot

 palmeiras.globo.com
 Guardian Stats Centre
 zerozero.pt
 globoesporte

1986 births
Living people
Brazilian footballers
Brazilian expatriate footballers
Brazilian expatriate sportspeople in Turkey
Expatriate footballers in Turkey
Clube de Regatas Brasil players
Cruzeiro Esporte Clube players
Denizlispor footballers
Sociedade Esportiva Palmeiras players
Ituano FC players
Esporte Clube Santo André players
Association football defenders